Wálter Luis Pelletti Vezzoso (born 31 May 1966) is a former Uruguayan footballer who played as a forward. He was an unused member of squad which won 1987 Copa América.

Career
Peletti played for Huracán, Banfield and Argentinos Juniors in the Primera División de Argentina. Peletti made 15 appearances for the senior Uruguay national football team from 1987 to 1993.

References

External links

1966 births
Living people
People from Fray Bentos
Uruguayan people of Italian descent
Uruguayan footballers
Uruguay international footballers
1987 Copa América players
1993 Copa América players
El Tanque Sisley players
Montevideo Wanderers F.C. players
CD Castellón footballers
Club Atlético Huracán footballers
Club Atlético Banfield footballers
Argentinos Juniors footballers
C.D. Antofagasta footballers
Argentine Primera División players
Uruguayan expatriate footballers
Expatriate footballers in Algeria
Expatriate footballers in Argentina
Expatriate footballers in Chile
ASM Oran players
Copa América-winning players

Association football forwards